In New South Wales, regional ministers have been appointed since 1995 on a part-time basis as part of the Government of New South Wales. Each minister has other departmental responsibilities, as well as specific responsibilities for one of the regions of New South Wales. The ministries with regional responsibilities first appeared in 2000 during the Carr Labor Government with a position looking after the Central Coast, this would later be expanded by the Iemma Labor Government from 2005 and O'Farrell Coalition Government in 2011 to five different positions including Western Sydney.

In 2015, the number of ministers was reduced to just three ministers: the Minister for Regional Development, the Minister for Western New South Wales and the Minister for Western Sydney. In the first Berejiklian ministry the portfolio of regional development changed to Regional New South Wales and a fourth regional portfolio created, Regional Water. Following the 2019 state election the ministries were rearranged, with the portfolio of Regional Water abolished and two new regional portfolios, Regional Transport and Roads and Regional Youth, bringing the total to five with effect from 2 April 2019. A sixth portfolio, Regional Health, was created in the second Perrottet ministry.

Current ministers
In the second Perrottet ministry there are six ministers with specific regional responsibility:

Central Coast

Regional New South Wales

Regional Health

Regional Transport and Roads

Regional Youth

Western New South Wales

Western Sydney

Former ministerial titles

Hunter

Illawarra
Creation of the role of 'Minister for the Illawarra' was a Labor election commitment in 2003. When the portfolio was abolished in 2015, the region's main newspaper, the Illawarra Mercury, noted that all but one of the men to hold the title later departed politics under a cloud: "The now-defunct ministry has been something of a poisoned chalice over the past 12 years, with five of the six ministers who have held the position being disgraced, sacked or forced to resign over their behaviour."

Labor's David Campbell, the first Minister for the Illawarra, quit politics after being filmed leaving a gay bath-house in Sydney. His successor Matt Brown quit following allegations (denied by Brown) that he'd simulated a sex act and danced in his underpants at a function in Parliament House. Paul McLeay quit cabinet after admitting to using a parliamentary computer to visit gambling and porn websites. Eric Roozendaal was a target of the Independent Commission Against Corruption's Operation Indus due to his dealings with disgraced former minister Eddie Obeid, but was cleared in 2013. Greg Pearce, the first Liberal to hold the post, was dumped from the O'Farrell ministry in 2013 amid claims (denied by Pearce) that he had attended parliament drunk – officially, for failing to declare a conflict of interest in relation to a board appointment. The last Minister for the Illawarra, the Liberal party's John Ajaka, "managed to break the portfolio’s curse," however.

North Coast

Redfern-Waterloo

See also

List of New South Wales government agencies

References

Ministers of the New South Wales state government